The red-capped flowerpecker (Dicaeum geelvinkianum) is a small passerine bird endemic to, and widespread within, New Guinea and adjacent islands. It has recently been split from the olive-crowned flowerpecker Dicaeum pectorale.

Identification
A common but inconspicuous tiny bird with short bill and tail, red cap, rump and, in the male, red spot on the breast.

Habitat
Forest and woodland, including secondary growth and mangroves.

Food
Small fruits, especially mistletoe, insects and spiders.

References

 BirdLife International (2006) Species factsheet: Dicaeum geelvinkianum. Downloaded from http://www.birdlife.org on 6/12/2006
 Coates, Brian J. The Birds of Papua New Guinea. Vol.II. Dove Publications: Queensland.

External links
Image at ADW

red-capped flowerpecker
Birds of New Guinea
red-capped flowerpecker